Palaeopomacentrus orphae is an extinct species of fish from the Ypresian epoch of Monte Bolca. It is the only known species of the genus Palaeopomacentrus.

References

Eocene fish
Pomacentridae
Fossils of Italy